Washington High School in Parkland, Washington, United States. It serves grades 9-12 in the Franklin Pierce Schools.

Its boundary includes most of Parkland and small portions of Tacoma.

Academics

Demographics

The demographic breakdown of the 981 students enrolled in 2015-2016 was:

Male - 52.3%
Female - 47.6%
Native American/Alaskan - 0.6%
Asian/Pacific islanders - 17.2%
Black - 16.6%
Hispanic - 19.6%
White - 34.4%
Multiracial - 11.6%

73.5% of the students were eligible for free or reduced-cost lunch. For 2015-2016, Washington was a Title I school.

Academics
, 57% of Washington High School students were enrolled in Advanced Placement courses.

Athletics
Sports offered by the school include cross country, cheerleading, track & field, football, golf,  volleyball, soccer, basketball, curling, wrestling, tennis, baseball, roller derby, fastpitch, polo, water polo, swimming, bowling, fencing and figure skating.

Notable alumni
 Q. Allan Brocka
 Lewis Bush
 Demetrious Johnson

References

External links

Franklin Pierce Schools

High schools in Pierce County, Washington
South Puget Sound League
Educational institutions established in 1971
Public high schools in Washington (state)